Alfa Romeo Tipo 316, 316 or 16C-316 Grand prix car was used in Grand Prix seasons 1938 and 1939, when it was driven by Giuseppe Farina and Clemente Biondetti. The Tipo 316 was one of three Alfa Romeo cars designed for the new rules in 1938, which differed mainly by the engine, the other two were the Alfa Romeo Tipo 308 straight-8 and Alfa Romeo Tipo 312 with a V12 engine. The car was based on Alfa Romeo 12C-37.
The engine was more powerful than the one in Tipo 308 or 312, but it was still not really competitive against Germans.

The car debuted at the first major race of the season for the Tripoli Grand Prix, where Biondetti resigned. In the primary race for the Grand Prix of Italy Farina scored in the second-place ranking is the only car on the podium, Biondetti was fourth. The last appearance of the car was on the primary race for the Grand Prix of Switzerland in the 1939 season, where Farina resigned after the first laps led. After that team efforts were devoted to 1.5 liter car Alfa Romeo 158 for Class Voiturette, and the Tipo 316 was no longer developed.

References
www.racing-database.com
www.kolumbus.fi

Tipo 316
Grand Prix cars